John Hospers (June 9, 1918 – June 12, 2011) was an American philosopher and political activist. Hospers was interested in Objectivism, and was once a friend of the philosopher Ayn Rand, though she later broke with him. In 1972, Hospers became the first presidential candidate of the Libertarian Party, and was the only minor party candidate to receive an electoral vote in that year's U.S. presidential election.

Education and career
John Hospers was born on June 9, 1918, in Pella, Iowa, the son of Dena Helena (Verhey) and John De Gelder Hospers. He graduated from Central College in 1939 before earning an MA in English from the University of Iowa in 1942 and a PhD in philosophy from Columbia University in 1946. He conducted research, wrote, and taught in areas of philosophy, including aesthetics and ethics. He taught philosophy at the University of Minnesota, Brooklyn College, California State College Los Angeles (1966–1968) and at the University of Southern California, where for many years he was chairman of the philosophy department and professor emeritus.

In 2002, an hour-long video about Hospers' life, work, and philosophy was released by the Liberty Fund of Indianapolis, as part of its Classics of Liberty series.

Friendship with Ayn Rand
During the period he taught philosophy at Brooklyn College, Hospers was very interested in Objectivism. He appeared on radio shows with Ayn Rand, and devoted considerable attention to her ideas in his ethics textbook Human Conduct.

According to Rand's biographer, Barbara Branden, Hospers met Rand when she addressed the student body at Brooklyn College.  They became friends, and had lengthy philosophical conversations.  Rand's discussions with Hospers contributed to her decision to write nonfiction.  Hospers read Atlas Shrugged (1957), which he considered an aesthetic triumph.  Although Hospers became convinced of the validity of Rand's moral and political views, he disagreed with her about issues of epistemology, the subject of their extensive correspondence. Hospers also disagreed with Rand about free will (with him favoring determinism, while she advocated a libertarian view) and conscription (Hospers supported it, Rand opposed this). Rand broke with Hospers after he, in his position as moderator, critiqued her address, and she felt he had criticized her talk on "Art and Sense of Life" before the American Society of Aesthetics at Harvard.

1972 presidential candidacy

In the 1972 U.S. Presidential election, Hospers and Tonie Nathan were the first presidential and vice-presidential nominees, respectively, of the newly formed Libertarian Party. The Libertarian Party was poorly organized and Hospers and Nathan managed to get on the ballot in only two states (Washington and Colorado), receiving 3,674 popular votes.

Hospers and Nathan received one electoral vote from faithless elector Roger MacBride, a Republican from Virginia, resulting in Nathan's becoming the first woman and the first Jew to receive an electoral vote in a United States presidential election.

Written work
Hospers' books include:
 Meaning and Truth in the Arts (1946)
 Introductory Readings in Aesthetics (1969)
 Artistic Expression (1971)
 Libertarianism – A Political Philosophy for Tomorrow (1971)
 Understanding the Arts (1982)
 Law and the Market (1985)
 Human Conduct (now in its 3rd edition, 1995)
 An Introduction to Philosophical Analysis (now in the 4th edition, 1996)

Hospers was editor of three anthologies, and contributed to books edited by others. He wrote more than 100 articles in various scholarly and popular journals.

Hospers was editor of The Personalist (1968–1982) and The Monist (1982–1992), and was a senior editor at Liberty magazine. Additionally Hospers wrote the article "Art and Morality" for the Journal of Comparative Literature and Aesthetics (JCLA), Vol. 1, No. 1, Summer 1978.

See also

 American philosophy
 Libertarianism in the United States
 List of American philosophers

References

External links

 JohnHospers.com
 

1918 births
2011 deaths
20th-century American politicians
American book editors
American magazine editors
American male non-fiction writers
Philosophers from Idaho
American political philosophers
American political writers
Brooklyn College faculty
California Libertarians
Columbia Graduate School of Arts and Sciences alumni
Determinists
Libertarian Party (United States) presidential nominees
Libertarian theorists
People from Pella, Iowa
Candidates in the 1972 United States presidential election
University of Southern California faculty
Writers from California
Writers from Iowa
Writers from New York City
Philosophers from California
Philosophers from New York (state)